The KTM 790 Duke is a naked parallel-twin motorcycle, manufactured by KTM from 2017. The Duke's  liquid cooled eight-valve DOHC engine uses a 285° crankshaft in order to mimic KTM's 75° V-Twins. Its power output is 105 bhp.

The Duke is KTM's first parallel-twin bike; previously the factory had produced only singles and V-twins. Released in 2018 for the European market, KTM propose to release the Duke as a 2019 model to the US market in late 2018.  Starting in 2021, this new model will be produced in China.  It appears that no changes will be made to KTM's warranty, which covers the lesser of two years or twenty-four thousand miles, and guarantees the frame, swingarm, ignition system, engine parts inside the crankcase.

The Duke is also the first middleweight naked with an inertial measurement unit within its electronics that include ride-by-wire, fuel modes, and multi-level traction control. It also includes a bi-directional quickshifter. With a dry weight of 169 kg, the pared-down design is said to make the Duke the lightest bike in the middleweight naked market. KTM cooperated with Maxxis to develop special tyres for the Duke.

Reception
The KTM Duke has received positive reviews.

In Motor Cycle News, senior bike tester Michael Neeves wrote that the KTM "manages to combine the best bits of its rivals", with "the speed and electronic sophistication of the Triumph Street Triple R, the punch and simplicity of the MT-07 and the cheekiness of the MT-09 ... with a dash of crazy 1290 Super Duke R".  Neeves praises the KTM's riding position and comfort, but points out that wind protection is non-existent. His overall verdict: "Its engine is a peach, the chassis balanced and it's topped off with superbike-spec electronics".

References

External links

KTM motorcycles
Motorcycles powered by straight-twin engines
Motorcycles introduced in 2018
Standard motorcycles